Kurgan State University is a university in Kurgan, Kurgan Oblast of Russia. It was established in 1995 in accordance with presidential decree No. 990 on 30 September 1995, merging the Kurgan Engineering Institute, dating from 1959, with the Kurgan State Pedagogical Institute, dating from 1951. The university prepares students in humanitarian, socio-economic and technical specialties.

The university campus comprises six buildings. Training is on teaching and laboratory-based area of over 52400 square meters.

Departments
 Natural Sciences
 History
 Psychology (psychology, defectology and sports)
 Education
 Technology
 Transport Systems
 Economics
 Philology
 Law

References

Universities in Russia
Kurgan, Kurgan Oblast
Educational institutions established in 1995
1995 establishments in Russia